The Wanang River is a river in Madang Province, Papua New Guinea.

Sogeram languages, also called Wanang languages, are spoken in the area.

See also
List of rivers of Papua New Guinea
Wanang River languages

References

Rivers of Papua New Guinea